Prephenic acid, commonly also known by its anionic form prephenate, is an intermediate in the biosynthesis of the aromatic amino acids phenylalanine and tyrosine, as well as of a large number of secondary metabolites of  the shikimate pathway.

It is biosynthesized by a [3,3]-sigmatropic Claisen rearrangement of chorismate.

Stereochemistry 

Prephenic acid is an example of achiral (optically inactive) molecule which has two pseudoasymmetric atoms (i.e. stereogenic but not chirotopic centers), the C1 and the C4 cyclohexadiene ring atoms. It has been shown that of the two possible diastereoisomers, the natural prephenic acid is one that has both substituents at higher priority (according to CIP rules) on the two pseudoasymmetric carbons, i.e. the carboxyl and the hydroxyl groups, in the cis configuration, or (1s,4s) according to the new IUPAC stereochemistry rules (2013).

The other stereoisomer, i.e. trans or, better, (1r,4r), is called epiprephenic.

See also
 C10H10O6

References

Hydroxy acids
Alpha-keto acids
Dicarboxylic acids
Cyclohexadienes